The Methodist Church in Cuba was a fruit of Methodist church from the US in 1883. It was interrupted the war against the Spanish rule.
In 1889 the American missionaries replanted the church. It became autonomous in 1968, and self-supporting in 1969.

The church has 320 congregations and 10,000 members.

References

External links
 Official website

Protestantism in Cuba
Methodism in the Caribbean